Irving Naxon (1902 – September 22, 1989) was an American inventor, who is most famous for inventing and patenting the slow cooker. Naxon was also the first Jewish engineer who worked for Western Electric.

Personal life 
Naxon was born in 1902 in Jersey City, New Jersey with the birth name Irving Nachumsohn. His mother had immigrated to the United States from Russia. His father died when he was two years old. He had two siblings, an older brother – Meyer – and a younger sister – Sadie. After his father's death, his family moved from Jersey City to Fargo, North Dakota, and then to Winnipeg, Manitoba. Naxon's mother moved him and his siblings to Winnipeg so that her oldest son, Meyer, could avoid the World War I draft. While in Canada, Naxon studied electrical engineering through a correspondence course. He moved back to Chicago sometime after. He married his wife Fern and they had three daughters, Jewel, Eileen, and Lenore.

In 1945, he changed his name from Nachumsohn to Naxon due to anti-German sentiment after WWII.

Career 
After receiving his electrical engineering training, Naxon worked as a telegrapher for the Canadian Pacific Railway. He later moved to Chicago and became the Western Electric’s first Jewish engineer. He continued working on his inventions outside of work and passed the patent bar exam to avoid hiring a lawyer. He founded his own company – Naxon Utilities Corporation.

In 1936, Naxon applied for a patent for the slow cooker. On January 23, 1940, he received that patent. The first iteration of Naxon's slow cooker was The Boston Beanery and later the Naxon Beanery and Flavor Crock. In 1970, Naxon retired and sold his business and his patent for the slowcooker to the Rival Company for a lump sum rather than stock. Rival Company rebranded Naxon's invention into what is now known as the Crock Pot.

In addition to the slow cooker, Naxon also invented serval other appliances and has over 200 patents to his name. He invented an electric frying pan and the hula lamp, a precursor to the lava lamp. Another notable invention of Naxon is his TeleSign, an electronic sign that shows moving text resembling today's news ticker.

Death 
Naxon died on September 22, 1989, in an Evanston nursing home. At the time, he was survived by his wife, three daughters, and five grandchildren.

References 

1902 births
1989 deaths
20th-century inventors
American Jews
Canadian Pacific Railway people
Inventors from New Jersey
Patent holders
People from Jersey City, New Jersey